Haradanahalli Deve Gowda Kumaraswamy, (born 16 December 1959) known among followers as Kumaranna (Kumar, the elder brother), is an Indian politician and businessman who served as the 12th Chief Minister of Karnataka from 23 May 2018 to 23 July 2019. He is a former president of the Karnataka State Janata Dal (Secular) and the son of former Chief Minister of Karnataka & former prime minister of India H. D. Deve Gowda.

Kumaraswamy has served two terms as the Chief Minister of Karnataka from 2006 to 2007 and 2018 to 2019. He resigned from the position of Chief Minister on 23 July 2019 after his coalition government lost a no trust motion in the 15th Assembly to the Bharatiya Janata Party.

Early life and education
Kumaraswamy was born in Haradanahalli, Holenarasipura taluk of Hassan district, Karnataka to H. D. Deve Gowda and Chennamma.

He completed primary education in a government school in Hassan district. He finished his high school studies in Bangalore's MES Educational Institution in Jayanagar and Bachelor of Science degree from National College Basavanagudi, Bangalore.

Personal life
On 13 March 1986, Kumaraswamy married Anitha Kumaraswamy. They have a son, Nikhil Gowda.He married actress Radhika secretly in 2006.In November 2010, Radhika revealed that she was married to H.D.Kumaraswamy, former chief Minister of Karnataka and they have a daughter named shamika reportedly.

Political career
Kumaraswamy entered politics by winning from Kanakapura (in Ramanagara District) in the 1996 general elections. He sought re-election from Kanakapura in 1998 and lost to M. V. Chandrashekara Murthy. This was Kumaraswamy's worst defeat ever where he lost by such a margin that he even forfeited his deposit.

He again contested unsuccessfully for a Sathanur assembly seat in 1999 when he was defeated by congress heavyweight D. K. Shivakumar. In 2004, he was elected to represent the Ramanagara assembly segment. When the 2004 state elections resulted in a hung assembly with no party getting enough seats to form a government, the Indian National Congress and Janata Dal (Secular) (JD(S)) parties decided to come together and form a coalition government. Known for his adaptability and friendly nature, Dharam Singh of the Congress was the unanimous choice of both parties to head the government. He was sworn in as chief minister on 28 May 2004. Forty-two MLAs of Janata Dal (Secular) under Kumaraswamy's leadership left the coalition and the government collapsed. On 28 January 2006, Karnataka Governor T. N. Chaturvedi invited Kumaraswamy to form the government in the state after the resignation of the Congress Government led by Dharam Singh.

He was Chief Minister of Karnataka from 4 February 2006 to 9 October 2007.
On 27 September 2007, Kumaraswamy said that he would leave office on 3 October as part of a power-sharing agreement between the Janata Dal (Secular) and the Bharatiya Janata Party (BJP), despite the calls of some legislators in the JD(S) for him to remain in office for the time being, due to complications in arranging the transfer of power. However, on 4 October 2007, he refused to transfer power to the BJP. Finally, on 8 October 2007, he tendered his resignation to Governor Rameshwar Thakur, and the state was put under President's rule two days later. However, he reconciled later and decided to offer support to the BJP. BJP's B. S. Yeddyurappa was sworn in as the Chief Minister of Karnataka on 12 November 2007.
But, again refused to support BJP government over a disagreement on sharing of ministries which resulted in Yeddyurappa resignation as Chief Minister on 19 November 2007.

After the untimely demise of Karnataka state JD(S) President Merajuddin Patel, he was elected unopposed as President of the state unit.

However, after the by-election results of Bangalore Rural Lok Sabha constituency and Mandya in which his party candidates lost, he resigned from the post of President of the Janata Dal (Secular) State unit, and as leader of the opposition.

However, party cadres succeeded in convincing him not to quit as leader of opposition in the Karnataka Assembly. In September 2013, A. Krishnappa was selected as Janata Dal-Secular's president for Karnataka, filling the vacancy left by Kumaraswamy.

In November 2014 Kumaraswamy was elected as Karnataka state Janata Dal (Secular) President. Kumaraswamy is also known for accusing political rivals of corruption.

In 2018 elections in Karnataka state, JD(S) was the third-largest party but after a post-poll alliance with the Rahul Gandhi led Indian National Congress, he was sworn in as the Chief Minister on 23 May 2018.

In the 2019 parliament elections, his son Nikhil Gowda contested in the Mandya (Lok Sabha constituency) against an independent candidate Sumalatha, wife of film actor  Late Ambareesh. Kumaraswamy took this contest as a prestige and campaigned all across the constituency. In vain his son lost the election by a margin of 1,30,000 odd votes. This was a major setback and abashment to Kumaraswamy in his political career. He also shed tears in a party convention in Mandya, recalling the election loss faced by his son.

On the month of July 2019, His Government lost its majority when 13 MLAs of Congress and 3 MLAs of his own party resigned to their MLA Posts. BSP MLA Mahesh N & 2 Independent MLAs withdrew their support for H.D.Kumaraswamy led coalition Government in Karnataka. On 23 July Kumaraswamy lost his majority in Karnataka floor test.
Kumaraswamy resigned to the Chief Minister post, by submitting his resignation letter to governor Vajubhai Vala on 23 July 2019. Then BJP was invited to form the government  as the single largest party, by the governor and B. S.Yediyurappa took oath as the Chief Minister of Karnataka by succeeding him.

Positions held

Source :

Electoral Performance

Film and television
Kumaraswamy is into film production and distribution. He has produced several Kannada films including Chandra Chakori, a huge hit, credited with 365 day-run in theaters. Surya Vamsha which was directed by S. Narayan was the debut movie produced by Kumaraswamy under Chennambika films, named after his mother. In 2016 his banner also produced his son's debut movie Jaguar (2016 film) and his 2nd movie Seetharama Kalyana in 2019.

In September 2007, Kumaraswamy started the Kannada television channel Kasturi. The channel is now owned and managed by his wife Anitha.

Controversies

Bigamy charges
Kumaraswamy was accused of bigamy which is illegal according to Hindu Marriage Act, 1955 of India. A public interest litigation was filed after media reports of his marriage to Kannada cinema actress Radhika Kumaraswamy surfaced. Since Kumaraswamy is married to his first wife Anitha, his second marriage with Radhika is a violation of law . However a division bench of Karnataka High Court headed by Chief Justice Vikramajit Sen dismissed the case citing "lack of proof".

Janthakal mining scam
Kumaraswamy and his wife Anitha are facing charges in the Janthakal mining scam. He is accused of pressuring a senior bureaucrat to renew Janthakal Enterprise's lease of iron ore mining for 40 years on the basis of forged documents and violating several rules. The bureaucrat, Ganga Ram Baderiya, was allegedly given kickbacks by Janthakal Enterprise. The owner of Janthakal Enterprises, mining baron Vinod Goel, was arrested in 2015 on charges of forgery. A Special Investigation Team (SIT) is probing this scam on the direction of Supreme Court of India.

Vishwabharati case
Kumaraswamy and his wife Anitha are accused of misuse of official position in allotment of 80 acres of land to Vishwabharati House Building Cooperative Society Ltd, a private cooperative society, which later made a quid pro quo site allotment to Anitha, during Kumaraswamy's tenure as Chief Minister in 2006.

Release of CD on Mangalore protests
Kumaraswamy called for a press meet and released a CD containing 35 video clips of the violence during the Mangalore protests against the CAA. The video presented the policemen acting violently against the protesters and beating up the civilians of the city, leading to riots in the city. He accused that the police directly followed the government orders inhumanly and were the main reason for the shoot out that killed 2 people during the protests.

The BJP in return accused that these video clips are all edited versions of older footages of some other circumstances. They also said that Kumaraswamy is misleading the people by producing inappropriate footages in public that provokes confusion and violence among the people. The BJP included saying that Kumaraswamy, being a senior politician in the state is directly accusing the government officials and the police, which is unacceptable.

Statements on RSS 

In February 2023, Kumarswamy said that a secret meet of RSS in Delhi, has decide to make a Brahmin, Pralhad Joshi, the next chief minister of Karnataka. This led to vast opposition from the BJP and also the Brahmin's Mahasabha, asking for an apology for these statements.

References

External links
H. D. Kumaraswamy affidavit

|-

|-

|-

|-

1959 births
Living people
Chief Ministers of Karnataka
India MPs 2009–2014
People from Ramanagara
Politicians from Bangalore
People from Hassan district
Children of prime ministers of India
Janata Dal (Secular) politicians
Janata Dal politicians
Karnataka MLAs 2013–2018
Lok Sabha members from Karnataka
India MPs 1996–1997
People from Bangalore Rural district
Candidates in the 2014 Indian general election
Leaders of the Opposition in the Karnataka Legislative Assembly
Kannada film producers
Film producers from Karnataka
Karnataka MLAs 2018–2023